Potto (Perodicticus potto) is a strepsirrhine primate of the family Lorisidae.

Potto may also refer to:

 Potto, North Yorkshire, a village in England
 Potto Brown (1797–1871), an English miller and philanthropist
 Vasily Potto, a Russian lieutenant-general and military historian

Animals
 Golden potto (Arctocebus sp.), two species of strepsirrhine primates
 False potto (Pseudopotto martini), a lorisoid primate of uncertain taxonomic status
 Kinkajou (Potos flavus), a mammal of the family Procyonidae related to coatis and raccoons

See also
 POTO (disambiguation)